The Sellers House is a historic house at 702 West Center Street in Beebe, Arkansas, United States.  It is a single story, with a gabled roof, weatherboard exterior, and brick foundation.  Several cross gables project from the roof, including one acting as a porch and porte cochere.  The gables show rafter ends in the Craftsman style.  The house was built about 1925, and is a particularly picturesque example of the Craftsman style in the city.

The house was listed on the National Register of Historic Places in 1991.

See also
National Register of Historic Places listings in White County, Arkansas

References

Houses on the National Register of Historic Places in Arkansas
Houses completed in 1925
Houses in White County, Arkansas
National Register of Historic Places in White County, Arkansas
Buildings and structures in Beebe, Arkansas
Bungalow architecture in Arkansas
American Craftsman architecture in Arkansas
1925 establishments in Arkansas